Mano Po 5: Gua Ai Di (also billed parenthetically as Mano Po 5: Gua Ai Di (I Love You)) is a 2006 Filipino romantic comedy-drama film produced by Regal Entertainment and the fifth installment of the Mano Po film series) It stars Charity and Richard Gutierrez as Nathan as a veterinarian with playboy tendencies who falls in love with Charity, a Chinese Filipino who always follows tradition.  In order to woo not only Charity but also her family, Nathan tries to follow and adapt Chinese culture, but with hilarious results.

Unlike the earlier films in the series, Mano Po 5 also has comedic elements from the previous film.

The film stars Lorna Tolentino, Angel Locsin and Richard Gutierrez, which already starred together in Mano Po 2: My Home. Asia's Superstar and Star In A Million finalist Christian Bautista also appeared in his first film at the height of his successful musical career.

Premise
Charity (Angel Locsin), a member of a rich Chinese-Filipino family, is torn between traditional Chinese arranged marriage on a Malaysian-Chinese-Filipino celebrity Timothy Lam/Felix Yan (Christian Bautista), or her newfound love Dr. Nathan Ramirez (Richard Gutierrez), a pure Filipino who works as a veterinarian.

Cast
Richard Gutierrez as Dr. Jonathan "Nathan" Ramirez, DVM
Angel Locsin as Charity Kho
Christian Bautista as Timothy Lam/Felix Yan
Lorna Tolentino as Yolanda "Yolly" Kho
Tirso Cruz III as Williamson "Willy" Kho
Ketchup Eusebio as Emerson Kho
AJ Dee as Anderson Kho
Boots Anson-Roa as Ama
Tony Mabesa as Ang Kong
Jaclyn Jose as Donita 
Gina Alajar as Mollie
Ambet Nabus as the Reporter

Production
The role of Yolanda Kho was originally supposed to be played by Dina Bonnevie. However, upon her return from the United States to shoot scenes for the then-upcoming teleserye Walang Kapalit, Bonnevie suffered bleeding induced by an ovarian cyst. Thus, she was replaced by Lorna Tolentino.

This marks the second time that Bonnevie was removed from the Mano Po, the first being Mano Po 2: My Home. In both instances,  Bonnevie withdrew from the film and the characters she was set to portray both went to Lorna Tolentino.

Awards

See also
Mano Po (Filipino film series)
Mano Po
Mano Po 2
Mano Po III: My Love
Ako Legal Wife
Bahay Kubo: A Pinoy Mano Po!
Mano Po 6: A Mother's Love
Mano Po 7: Tsinoy

References

External links

2006 films
2006 romantic comedy-drama films
Philippine romantic comedy-drama films
Regal Entertainment films
2006 comedy films
2006 drama films
Films directed by Joel Lamangan